This Is Seb Clarke (TISC) are an English 12-piece soul-punk ensemble from Stoke-On-Trent, North Staffordshire. Their line-up plays Hammond organ, piano, bass, drums, lead guitar, rhythm guitar and has a brass section. The group are named after their frontman and principal songwriter, Sebastian Clarke.

This Is Seb Clarke's debut album, Rover was released in 2005. "Spring Morning Sunshine" reached No. 12 in the UK Indie Chart in 2006.  The follow-up single, "I Just Can’t Carry On", from their second album, Vox, entered the indie chart at No. 7. Their third single "Rock 'n' Roll Alamo - pt 7" reached No. 1 on the same chart on 5 April 2008.

Discography

Albums

Singles

References

External links
Official website
This Is Seb Clarke - Myspace
This Is Seb Clarke - Last.fm

English rock music groups
Music in Stoke-on-Trent